The Sanctuary Wood Museum Hill 62,  east of Ypres, Belgium is a private museum located in the neighbourhood of the Canadian Hill 62 Memorial and the Sanctuary Wood Cemetery. 

The museum was owned by Jacques Schier, the grandson of the farmer who founded the museum and owned the site of the museum since before World War I and left it as he had founded it. He was known as 'Fat Jacques' to generations of visitors. The museum has a collection of World War I items, including a rare collection of 3-dimensional photographs, weapons, uniforms and bombs. A preserved section of the British trench lines is located behind the museum. 

The museum also has a small bar, café and gift shop.

Image Gallery

See also
 Battle of Hill 60
 Hill 62 Memorial
 Battle of Passchendaele
 Tyne Cot Memorial

External links

 Museum Hill 62 Sanctuary Wood
 Pilgrimage to Ypres
 Sanctuary Wood Museum (Hill 62)

References

Canada in World War I
World War I museums in Belgium
World War I sites in Belgium
Buildings and structures in Ypres
British Army in World War I
Museums in West Flanders